Finch Field is a baseball venue in Thomasville, North Carolina, United States. It is owned and operated by the City of Thomasville and is directly managed by the Thomasville Parks and Recreation Department. It is home to the High Point-Thomasville HiToms of the Coastal Plain League, a collegiate summer baseball league.  The park was built in 1935 and has been renovated in 2002, 2005, and 2007.

The park's dimensions are 325 ft. down the left field line, 350 ft. to left center, 390 ft. to dead center field, 365 ft. to right center, and 330 ft. down the right field line.

Tenants

Current
The park currently hosts the Coastal Plain League's High Point-Thomasville HiToms.  The High Point-Thomasville HiToms began playing at Finch Field in 1999, the same year as their inception in the league. During their time at Finch, the team has won three Coastal Plain League championships.

Former
The park has hosted numerous other professional teams since its construction in 1935. Below is a table with team names and the seasons in which they played at Finch Field.

Other
In addition to professional and collegiate summer baseball, the park is home to numerous amateur baseball teams. Area American Legion baseball teams and the Thomasville High School teams both utilize the field.

Renovations
In 1982, the park's original grandstand was burned down by arson.  A metal seating structure was erected soon after.  In 2002, the High Point-Thomasville HiToms installed new lighting and fencing.  Soon after, in 2005, the 1980s seating structure was replaced with a new grandstand.  Also in 2005, new dugouts and concessions were built.  In 2007, a new infield was installed at the field.

A scoreboard was constructed past the left field fence was built during the 1950s and has recently been renovated.

References

Minor league baseball venues
College baseball venues in the United States
Buildings and structures in Davidson County, North Carolina
Baseball venues in North Carolina
1935 establishments in North Carolina
Thomasville, North Carolina
Sports venues completed in 1935